2012 in the Philippines details events of note that happened in the Philippines in 2012.

Incumbents

 

 President: Benigno Aquino III (Liberal)
 Vice President: Jejomar Binay (PDP-Laban)
 Chief Justice: 
 Renato Corona (until May 29)
 Antonio Carpio (acting)  (from May 29 – August 24)
 Maria Lourdes Sereno (from August 24)
 Philippine Congress: 15th Congress of the Philippines
 Senate President: Juan Ponce Enrile
 House Speaker: Feliciano Belmonte, Jr.

Events

January
 January 5–7 – A landslide happens in Compostela Valley, where more than 30 people are reportedly dead, and 50 still missing.
 January 15 – The Moro National Liberation Front (MNLF) declares the Independence of Bangsamoro Land (Sulu, Mindanao, Palawan, Sabah) in Valencia Bukidnon.

 January 16 – Impeachment trial of Chief Justice Renato Corona begins.

February
 February 6 – A 6.9-magnitude earthquake hits Negros and Cebu provinces, killing at least 52 people. The earthquake caused heavy landslides and huge cracks on highways, and violently shook buildings.

April
 April 8–10 – The Philippine Navy spot Chinese fishermen fishing on the disputed Scarborough Shoal and attempted to detain the fishermen on April 10 but was blocked by the Chinese maritime surveillance ship which led to a diplomatic standoff over the shoal and the further severance of Chinese ties with the Philippines.
 April 28 – The United Nations approves the territorial claim of the Philippines to Benham Plateau (known as Benham Rise), a 13-million hectare undersea landmass off the coast of Aurora Province that possibly rich in mineral deposits.

May
 May 29 – Supreme Court Chief Justice Renato Corona votes 20–3, is found guilty and convicted at the conclusion of the Impeachment Trial and is removed from the office.

June
 June 6 – The Venus transit of June 6, 2012 is the second and last of two Venus transits of the 21st century, it was witnessed by amateur astronomers and sky watchers throughout the country since the first transit happened on June 8, 2004.
 June 23 – Bacoor becomes a city in the province of Cavite through ratification of Republic Act 10160 which was approved on April 10.

July
 July 21 – Mabalacat becomes a city in the province of Pampanga through ratification of Republic Act 10164 which was approved on May 15.
 July 25 – Former President Gloria Macapagal Arroyo is released from hospital arrest on bail.

August 
 From late July into the first week of August, heavy rain brought on by Typhoons Saola and Haikui causes widespread flooding in many parts of the Philippines, which affected 2.4 million people. The capital Manila was the worst-affected. Many people fled their homes, and around 362,000 people sheltered in evacuation centres. As of August 8, the death toll was confirmed to be at least 53, then a few days later, reports confirmed the death toll at 60. As of August 13, confirmed deaths had risen to 89.
 August 4 – Cabuyao becomes a city in the province of Laguna after ratification of Republic Act 10163 which was approved on May 16.
 August 11 – Ilagan becomes a city in the province of Isabela after ratification of Republic Act 10169 which was approved on June 12.
 August 18 – A plane carrying four people – two pilots, the Secretary of the Department of the Interior and Local Government Jesse Robredo and his aide, crashes off the shore of Masbate Island en route to Robredo's hometown of Naga City from Cebu City. His aide survived the crash, however the Secretary and the two pilots did not survive.
 August 31 – A 7.6-magnitude earthquake strike off the east of Samar Island, causing tsunami evacuations and power cuts.

September
 September 12 – The Cybercrime Prevention Act is officially signed into law by President Benigno Aquino III.

October
 October 15 – The Philippine government signs a document touted as the Framework Agreement on the Bangsamoro, which culminates the Aquino Administration's effort to end the deadlock in the peace process. This new document, while merely providing for a general framework for the actual peace negotiations, announces that "the status quo is unacceptable and that the Bangsamoro shall be established to replace the Autonomous Region in Muslim Mindanao (ARMM). The Bangsamoro is the new autonomous political entity (NPE) referred to in the Decision Points of Principles as of April 2012." According to President Aquino, this was the agreement that "can finally seal genuine, lasting peace in Mindanao." with Bangsamoro replacing ARMM which was described by President Benigno Aquino III as "a failed experiment".

December

 La Luna Roja, the first full-length flamenco ballet is performed on a Philippine stage.
 December 4 – Typhoon Bopha (Pablo) causes widespread destruction on the island of Mindanao, leaving thousands of people homeless. The cyclone is said to be one of the deadliest storms ever to hit the Philippines in decades. As of December 9, the death toll had climbed to 540, with 827 people still missing.
 December 21 – The controversial Reproductive Health Bill is signed into law by President Benigno Aquino III.

Holidays

On December 11, 2009, Republic Act No. 9849 declared Eidul Adha as a regular holiday. Also amending Executive Order No. 292, also known as The Administrative Code of 1987, the following are regular and special days shall be observed. The EDSA Revolution Anniversary was proclaimed since 2002 as a special nonworking holiday. On February 25, 2004, Republic Act No. 9256 declared every August 21 as a special nonworking holiday to be known as Ninoy Aquino Day. Note that in the list, holidays in bold are "regular holidays" and those in italics are "nationwide special days".

 January 1 – New Year's Day
 February 25 – EDSA Revolution Anniversary
 April 5 – Maundy Thursday
 April 6 – Good Friday
 April 9 – Araw ng Kagitingan (Day of Valor)
 May 1 – Labor Day
 June 12 – Independence Day
 August 18 – Eidul Fitr
 August 21 – Ninoy Aquino Day
 August 26 – National Heroes Day
 October 25 – Eidul Adha
 November 1 – All Saints Day
 November 30 – Bonifacio Day
 December 25 – Christmas Day
 December 30 – Rizal Day
 December 31 – Last Day of the Year

In addition, several other places observe local holidays, such as the foundation of their town. These are also "special days."

Entertainment and Culture

 October 21 – Pedro Calungsod was canonized in the Vatican City. He is the 2nd Filipino saint.
 December 21 – Philippine Representative Janine Tugonon Placed 1st Runner-up, at the Miss Universe 2012 Pageant held in Las Vegas, US.

Concerts
January 12 – Simple Plan Get Your Heart On! Tour live at the Smart Araneta Coliseum
January 17 – The Ventures Guitar Mania live at the CCP Main Theatre
January 18 – AJ Rafael Red Roses Asia Tour live at the Music Museum
January 22 – Katy Perry The California Dreams Tour live at the SM Mall of Asia Concert Grounds
January 27 – Rap-Rockan Rockoverload 2 live at the Metro Bar 47 West Avenue Quezon City
January 28 – Anne Curtis Annebisyosa Concert live at the Smart Araneta Coliseum
February 9 – Channel V Music Festival 2012 live at the Metrowalk Parking Lot, Metrowalk Complex
February 12 – Engelbert Humperdinck live at the Waterfront Hotel Cebu
February 14:
Engelbert Humperdinck live at The Manila Hotel
Ogie Alcasid and Regine Velasquez: Mr. & Mrs A live at the Smart Araneta Coliseum
February 15 – Engelbert Humperdinck live at the Smart Araneta Coliseum 
February 16 – Avril Lavigne The Black Star Tour live at the Smart Araneta Coliseum
February 17 – James Ingram live at the Smart Araneta Coliseum
February 18 – James Ingram live at the Waterfront Hotel, Cebu City
February 19 – Evanescence and Bush live at the Smart Araneta Coliseum
February 20 – Citipointe: Hope Is Erupting Tour live at the Philsports Arena
February 25 – A1, Blue, and Jeff Timmons The Greatest Hits Tour live at the Smart Araneta Coliseum
March 2 – Jose and Wally A Party For Every Juan live at the Smart Araneta Coliseum
March 5 – Death Cab For Cutie live at the NBC Tent
March 8 – Smash Project: Cobra Starship, The Used, The Cab and Dashboard Confessional live at the Smart Araneta Coliseum
March 9 – Charice Infinity Tour live at the Smart Araneta Coliseum
March 11 – Charice Infinity Tour live at the Waterfront Hotel, Cebu City
March 12 – OMD History of Modern live at the Smart Araneta Coliseum
March 16 – A Day To Remember live at the Ynares Sports Arena
March 17:
Brian Mcknight live at the Waterfront Cebu City Hotel
Cyndi Lauper live at the Smart Araneta Coliseum
March 23 – 100 Years of Coca-Cola Concert ng Bayan live at the SM Mall of Asia Concert Grounds
March 28 – The Platters live at the Aliw Theater
March 30 – Hanson: Shout It Out Tour live at the Smart Araneta Coliseum
March 31:
Hanson: Shout It Out Tour live at the Waterfront Hotel, Cebu City
Olivia Newton-John live at the Smart Araneta Coliseum
April 10 – The Cranberries live at the Smart Araneta Coliseum
April 11 – LMFAO live at the Smart Araneta Coliseum
April 12 – The Stylistics live at the Smart Araneta Coliseum
April 13 – Taking Back Sunday live at the SM Skydome
April 22 – Greyson Chance live at the Smart Araneta Coliseum
April 24 – Sergio Mendez live at the Smart Araneta Coliseum
May 1 – Secondhand Serenade live at the SM Skydome
May 13 – Morrissey live at the World Trade Center
May 21 & 22 – Lady Gaga The Born This Way Ball Tour live at the Mall of Asia Arena
May 26 – Lifehouse live at the Smart Araneta Coliseum
May 28 – We The Kings live at the Hard Rock Cafe
June 3 – NKOTBSB New Kids on the Block Backstreet Boys live at the Mall of Asia Arena
June 7 – Michelle Branch and Jojo live at the Smart Araneta Coliseum
June 12 – Malayang Pilipino Independence Day Concert live at the Quirino Grandstand
June 16 – Original Pilipino Music Artists ICONS at the Arena live at the Mall of Asia Arena
June 21 – The Fray live at the Mall of Asia Arena
July 7 – Sarah Geronimo 24/SG: The Birthday Concert live at the Smart Araneta Coliseum
July 11:
Nicki Minaj The Pink Friday Tour live at the Mall of Asia Arena
Silverstein live at the Area 05 Superclub, Bellasio Square, Toas Morato, Quezon City
July 14 – David Cook live at the Smart Araneta Coliseum
July 15 – David Cook live at the Waterfront Hotel Cebu City
August 3 – Nina Unleashed live at the Metro Bar 47 West Avenue Quezon City
August 8 – The Smashing Pumpkins live at the Smart Araneta Coliseum
August 9:
Cirque Du Soleil live at the Mall of Asia Arena
Snow Patrol: Fallen Empires Tour live at the Smart Araneta Coliseum
August 10 – Tears for Fears live at the Smart Araneta Coliseum
August 16 – Nelly Furtado & Gym Class Heroes live at the Smart Araneta Coliseum 
August 18 – Anne Curtis Annebisyosa No Other Concert World Tour live at the University of Southeastern Philippines Gym, Davao City
September 14 – The Wanted live at the NBC Tent, Fort Bonifacio, Taguig
September 18:
Maroon 5 Live at the Smart Araneta Coliseum
Dolphy Alay Tawa: A Musical Tribute to the King of Philippine Comedy live at the Mall of Asia Arena
September 21 – American Idol Live Tour at the Smart Araneta Coliseum
September 26 – The Killers live at the Smart Araneta Coliseum
September 28 – Aiza Seguerra Bente Singko The Anniversary Concert live at the Smart Araneta Coliseum
October 2 – Keane Strangeland Tour live at the Mall of Asia Arena
October 9 – James Morrison The Awakening World Tour live at the Smart Araneta Coliseum
October 10 – David Guetta live at the Mall of Asia Arena
October 12 – Wilson Phillips live at the Mall of Asia Arena
October 17 – America with Kalapana live at the Smart Araneta Coliseum
October 19:
America with Kalapana live at the Waterfront Hotel
Jonas Brothers live at the Mall of Asia Arena
October 21:
America with Kalapana live at the University of Baguio
Kamikazee live at the Robinsons Place Lipa
October 24: Big Bang Alive Galaxy Tour live at the Mall of Asia Arena
October 26: 
Rachelle Ann Go Rise Against Gravity live at the Music Museum
Tanduay Rhum Rock Fest Year 6 live at the SM Mall of Asia Concert Grounds
November 8: Don Moen live at the Smart Araneta Coliseum
November 9: Don Moen live at the Bohol Wisdom School Gym Tagbiliran
November 11: Don Moen live at the FSUU Gym Butuan
November 16: Regine Velasquez Silver The 25th Anniversary Concert live at the Mall of Asia Arena
November 26: Jennifer Lopez Dance Again World Tour live at the Mall of Asia Arena
November 30: Ako Naman!!! Ate Gay sa Arena live at the Mall of Asia Arena
December 9: Sting Back to Bass Tour live at the Mall of Asia Arena
December 17: Ely Buendia The Greatest Hits live at the SBCA Gymnasium
December 18: Pinoy Music Fest '12 live at the Smart Araneta Coliseum

Sports
 January 29 – Basketball: The Talk 'N Text Tropang Texters win the 2011–12 PBA Philippine Cup, its fifth PBA championship.
 March 19 – Football:  The Philippine Football Team placed third in 2012 AFC Challenge Cup in Nepal.
 May 6 – Basketball: The B-Meg Llamados wins defeating the Talk 'N Text Tropang Texters 84–90 in Overtime to win the 2012 PBA Commissioner's Cup Finals.
 June 10 – Boxing: Manny Pacquiao lost his WBO Welterweight Championship belt to Timothy Bradley.
 June 23 – Motorsport: Filipino-Swiss Marlon Stöckinger won the second race of the 2012 Monaco GP3 Series, becoming the first Filipino to win a formula race in Europe;
 July 27–August 12 – Multi-Sport Event: – The Philippine team participated in the 2012 Summer Olympics in London, United Kingdom. The 11-man team brought home no medals.
 August 5 – Basketball: The Rain or Shine Elasto Painters wins defeating the B-Meg Llamados 83–76 to win the 2012 PBA Governors' Cup Finals.
 August 26 – Basketball: The Philippines men's national basketball team won the championship in the 2012 William Jones Cup for the fourth time.
 August 29–September 9 – Multi Sport Event: The Philippines competed at the 2012 Summer Paralympics in London, England from August 29 to September 9, 2012. The nation had competed as of fifth participation attainment of the games. Philippine Sports Association for the Differently Abled-NPC Philippines fielded 9 athletes to compete in four sports. The 2012 Philippine Paralympic team was the biggest Philippine delegation since the 1988 Paralympics in Seoul, South Korea. Although no medals were won by the 9 athletes, Josephine Medina's performance in table tennis was the best finish for the Philippines, having ranked 4th overall in Paralympic Table Tennis standings.
 September 14–22 – Basketball: The Philippine Basketball Team participated in the 2012 FIBA Asia Cup, held at Ōta, Tokyo, Japan. The team made impressive performance, winning 3 games and losing 1, one in the preliminary round
 September 22 – Cheerleading: The UP Pep Squad won the UAAP Cheerdance Competition. FEU Cheering Squad placed second, while the NU Pep Squad placed third.
 September 25–29 – Football: The Philippines hosted the 2012 Philippine Peace Cup in Manila. The Philippines won first place in the tournament
 October 11 – Basketball: The Ateneo Blue Eagles wins series 2-0 has beaten the UST Growling Tigers, 65–62, to win their fifth straight in UAAP championships.
 October 26 – Basketball: The San Beda Red Lions wins series 2-1 has beaten the Letran Knights, 67–39, to win their third straight in NCAA championships.
 December 8 – Boxing: Manny Pacquiao lost his fourth fight with Juan Manuel Marquez in the sixth round via knockout.
 December 15 – Boxing: Nonito Donaire successfully retained the WBO and The Ring super bantamweight titles against the Mexican Legend Jorge Arce via third round knock out 2:59 into the round. Donaire floored Arce once in the second round, and once in the third round, before the knockout that ended the match.

Births
 February 1 – Athena Calica, wushu practitioner, daughter of 2001 Southeast Asian Games winner Jerome Calica and contestant in It's Showtime's Mini Miss U
 August 22 – Sebastian Benedict, actor 
 October 17 – Baylee van den Berg, half-South African model and actress
 November 1 – Khevynne Arias, actress
 November 27  – Raphael Landicho, actor

Deaths

January 5 – Christopher Guarin, Filipino journalist, gunshot wound. (born 1970)
January 9 – Salvador A. Rodolfo, Sr., Filipino war hero, leukemia. (born 1919)
January 26 – Iggy Arroyo, former Congressman of Negros Occidental and younger brother of former First Gentleman Mike Arroyo, liver cirrhosis (born 1951)
January 29 – Maan Panganiban, former courtside reporter turn News5 reporter, lymphoma (born 1986)
February 3 – Karlo Maquinto, former flyweight division, comatose/blot clot (born 1990)
February 4 – Soledad Duterte, Filipina teacher and activist, mother of the 16th President of the Philippines, Rodrigo Duterte (born 1916)
February 9 – Sony Music Philippines, Philippine record label, piracy. (established 1995, resumed in 2018)
February 18 – Linda Estrella, Filipina movie star from Sampaguita Pictures (born 1922)
February 29 – Horacio Morales, Secretary of Agrarian Reform from 1998 to 2001, heart attack (born 1943)
March 2 – Isagani Yambot, veteran Philippine newsman and publisher of Philippine Daily Inquirer, heart attack (born 1934)
March 9 – Jose Tomas Sanchez, Roman Catholic Prefect Emeritus of the Congregation for the Clergy and Cardinal Priest from the Philippines, multiple organ failure (born 1920)
March 11:
Arnold Vicencio, former Malabon Vice Mayor (born 1971)
Azucena Grajo Uranza, Filipino novelist, short story writer, and playwright in the English language. (born 1929)
March 13:
Karl Roy, singer (Kapatid, P.O.T.), cardiac arrest (born 1968)
Bodjie Dasig, singer, cancer (born 1964)
March 15 – Luis Gonzales, Filipino movie star from Sampaguita Pictures, pneumonia (born 1928)
April 5 – Angelo Castro, Jr., former ABS-CBN anchor/journalist and father of UNTV anchor Diego Castro III, cancer (born 1945)
April 6 – Nita Javier, former LVN actress, cancer (born 1932)
May 11:
Alma Bella, Filipino actress.(born 1910)
Tony DeZuniga, Filipino comic book artist and co-creator of Jonah Hex and Black Orchid, complications from stroke. (born 1932)
May 15 – Edgardo M. Reyes, Filipino novelist and writers. (born 1936)
May 20 – Lito Balquiedra, Jr., radio personality, heart attack (born 1942)
June 21 – Tony Espejo, Theater director (born 1948)
June 26 – Mario O'Hara, award-winning director, leukemia (born 1944)
June 29 – Perla Dizon Santos-Ocampo, Filipino scientist and pediatrician (born 1931)
July 8 – Buboy Favor, executive producer of various GMA Network shows (born 1964)
July 10 – Dolphy, actor and comedian dubbed the "King of Comedy", chronic obstructive pulmonary disease and multiple organ failure (born July 25, 1928)
July 13 – Maita Gomez, Filipina beauty queen and activist, Miss Philippines–World (1967), heart attack (born 1947)
July 15 – Eloisa Cruz Canlas a.k.a. Lola Sela Bungangera, Radio drama queen (born 1945)
August 5 – Ramon Igaña, Jr., cyclist (born 1968)
August 7 – Dong Fajardo, director and also in 90s TV commercial of Boysen Paint "Preso" (born 1995)
August 18 – Jesse Robredo, Department of the Interior and Local Government secretary, plane crash (born 1958)
August 24 – Ike Jarlego, film editor and director (born 1944)
September 3 – Tito Oreta, Malabon Mayor (born 1938)
September 5 – Eddie Apostol, broadcast journalist, DXND AM Cotabato City (born 1957)
September 23 – Darwin Ramos, servant of god (born 1994)
September 25 – Jun Bote Bautista, news broadcaster and journalist (born 1939)
September 30 – Butch Maniego, sportscaster and executive director of the PBA D-League (born 1962)
October 8 – Marilou Diaz-Abaya, multi-awarded film director, breast cancer (born 1955)
November 6 – Julie Ann Rodelas, talent and model of ABS-CBN, murder (born 1992)
November 8 – Julius Cauzo, broadcast journalist, DWJJ Cabanatuan City (born 1961)
November 10 – Geneviere Pascasio, rock musician and frontman of the band Grin Department, colon cancer (born 1970)
November 14 – Enrique Beech, Olympic sport shooter.(born 1920)
November 20 – Pedro Bantigue y Natividad, Filipino Roman Catholic prelate, Bishop of San Pablo (1967–1995), internal bleeding (born 1920)
November 26 – Celso Advento Castillo, Filipino director and actor, cardiac arrest (born 1943)
November 27 – Jackie Regala Katigbak, Journalists and concert producer (born 1961)
December 14 – Mohd Noor Fikrie Bin Abd Kahar, Malaysian-born terrorist group member, Jemaah Islamiyah, murder (born 1986)
December 23 – Jerusalino Araos, Filipino sculptor, heart attack.(born 1944)
December 24 – Carolina Griño-Aquino, Filipino judge, Supreme Court (1988–1993) and Court of Appeals.(born 1923)
December 25 – Erico Aumentado, Filipino politician, member of the House of Representatives for Bohol (since 2010), pneumonia.(born 1940)
December 31 – James B. Reuter, American academician in the Philippines, theater writer, director and producer (born 1916)

References

 
2012 in Southeast Asia
Philippines
2010s in the Philippines
Years of the 21st century in the Philippines